The MTV Romania Music Awards 2006 were presented on June 3 at Sala Sporturilor Horia Demian in Cluj-Napoca, Romania. This was the fifth time the MTV Romania Music Awards have been presented.

Awards

 Best Group: Akcent (Dragoste de închiriat)
 Best Song: Morandi (Beijo (Uh la la))
 Best Female: Loredana (Le le)
 Best Male: Ştefan Bănică, Jr. (Numele tău)
 Best Hip-Hop: Sişu & Puya (Adevărul Gol Goluţ)
 Best New Act: Heaven, (Pentru totdeauna)
 Best Dance: DJ Project (Şoapte)
 Best Album: Pavel Stratan (Amintiri din copilărie)
 Best Rock: Iris (Maxima)
 Best Pop: Voltaj (Povestea oricui)
 Best Live Performance: Proconsul (Iaşi 2005, MTV Live)
 Best Video: Morandi (Falling asleep)
 Free Your Mind Award: Soknan Han Jung - UN

References

External links
 Official MTV Romania Music Awards 2006 Site

MTV Romania Music Awards
2006 in Romanian music
Romanian music awards